Joseph Carberry (1853October 18, 1928) was an Irish American farmer and Democratic politician.  He was a member of the Wisconsin State Assembly, representing  during the 1903 session.

Biography
Joseph Carberry was born in the town of Friendship, Wisconsin, on his family's farm, known as "Carberry's Corners" near the southeast corner of the township.  He received a common school education and, in 1888, he established his own farm in the neighboring town of Empire.  He ultimately returned to his family's Friendship homestead in 1892, and cultivated that farm for the rest of his life.

In Friendship, he was elected town clerk for six years and served another six years as chairman of the town board.  He also represented his town on the Fond du Lac County board of supervisors.

In 1902, incumbent state representative Raphael Katz died while running for re-election.  The Democratic committee in Fond du Lac County selected Carberry as their candidate just a few days before the election.  He narrowly prevailed in the general election and represented the district in the Wisconsin State Assembly for the 1903 session, but did not run for re-election in 1904.

He returned to his farm and worked until retiring about 1918.  He died on his farm in Friendship in 1928.

Personal life and family
Joseph Carberry was a son of Irish American immigrants Charles Carberry and his wife Mary ( McDebbitt).  Charles Carberry served in the 17th Wisconsin Infantry Regiment during the American Civil War.  

Joseph Carberry married Martha Reilly, the daughter of another prominent Fond du Lac County farmer.  They had at least three children.

Electoral history

Wisconsin Assembly (1902)

| colspan="6" style="text-align:center;background-color: #e9e9e9;"| General Election, November 4, 1902

References

1853 births
1928 deaths
American people of Irish descent
20th-century American politicians
People from Friendship, Wisconsin
Farmers from Wisconsin
Democratic Party members of the Wisconsin State Assembly